Canada competed at the 1984 Winter Olympics in Sarajevo, Yugoslavia. Canada has competed at every Winter Olympic Games.

As Calgary would be the host city of the following Winter Olympics, its mascots made an appearance at the closing ceremony.

Medalists

Alpine skiing

Men

Women

Bobsleigh

Cross-country skiing

Men

Women

Figure skating

Men

Women

Pairs

Ice Dancing

Ice hockey

Group B
Top two teams (shaded ones) advanced to the medal round.

Canada 4-2 USA
Canada 8-1 Austria
Canada 4-2 Finland
Canada 8-1 Norway
Czechoslovakia 4-0 Canada

Medal round

USSR 4-0 Canada
Sweden 2-0 Canada

Carried over group Match:
Czechoslovakia 4-0 Canada
Team Roster
Darren Eliot
Mario Gosselin
Warren Anderson
Robin Bartel
J. J. Daigneault
Bruce Driver
Doug Lidster
James Patrick
Craig Redmond
Russ Courtnall
Kevin Dineen
Dave Donnelly
Pat Flatley
Dave Gagner
Vaughn Karpan
Darren Lowe
Kirk Muller
Dave Tippett
Carey Wilson
Dan Wood
Head coach: Dave King

Luge

Women

Ski jumping

Speed skating

Men

Women

References

 Olympic Winter Games 1984, full results by sports-reference.com

Nations at the 1984 Winter Olympics
1984
Winter Olympics